Eurotix is a synthpop project from Gävle, Sweden, consisting of the musicians Dennis Alexis Hellström (born in 1984) and Larry Forsberg (born in 1965), who started the duo in 2013. Eurotix's music and sound is inspired by the 80's synthpop and dance music. It has influences from italo disco, euro disco and Hi-NRG, but also from Swedish schlager music.

Larry Forsberg is a songwriter and producer. He has written songs for acts participating in Melodifestivalen, such as After Dark, Jill Johnson, Bradsta City Släckers and Östen med Resten. In 2016 he co-wrote songs for Anna Book and After Dark. However, since Anna's song was disqualified, the song with only be performed in Melodifestivalen, but not eligible for voting.

Dennis Alexis Hellström is the singer and frontman of the group. He has earlier released music under the pseudonym Bimbo Boy. He's working at a local newspaper in Gävle, while also running three blogs.

Eurotix released their first studio album, The Secret, in 2014. They have released several singles and EPs since 2013, many of them with accompanying music videos. The song "Kiss Them For Me", a single from their second album Deux, is a tribute to princess Diana, an open letter from Diana to Charles.

In December 2015, Eurotix received their first number one with the italo disco track "The Best Of Times" on the radio station Club 80's "New Generation Chart". It was still at number one when January's chart was presented. The track has been voted by the fans to be the next single/EP taken from the Deux album.

Discography

Albums
 2014: The Secret
 2015: Deux
 2016: Besides
 2018: Pop
 2019: Try Again - Remixed, Remade & Remodeled
 2020: The Best Of Times 2013–2020

Singles and EPs
 2013: "I Plead Insanity"
 2014: "Life As It Slips Away"
 2014: "Let's Die Young"
 2014: "Are You Strong Enough?"
 2014: "He'll Be Home For Christmas"
 2015: "Kiss Them For Me"
 2015: "Kiss Them For Me (Remixes)"
 2015: "Christmas On My Own"
 2016: "The Best Of Times"
 2017: "Conquer The Universe"
 2018: "Naughty Boys"
 2018: "My Eyes"
 2018: "Hypnotized"
 2019: "Cold"
 2020: "I Forget Myself"
 2020: "We Could Have Been" (new version)
 2021: "Love Take Me Higher"

References

External links 
Official Website
Official Facebook page
Official Twitter
Discogs
Soundcloud
Last.fm
VKontakte
Plastic Retro - Eurotix fan page

Swedish synthpop groups
Swedish musical duos
Musical groups established in 2013
2013 establishments in Sweden